The rufous-sided scrub tyrant (Euscarthmus rufomarginatus) is a species of bird in the family Tyrannidae. It is found in Bolivia, Brazil, Paraguay, and Suriname. Its natural habitats are dry savanna, subtropical or tropical dry shrubland, and subtropical or tropical dry lowland grassland. It is threatened by habitat loss.

References

Euscarthmus
Birds of Brazil
Birds of the Cerrado
Birds described in 1868
Taxa named by August von Pelzeln
Taxonomy articles created by Polbot